53 Persei is a single variable star in the northern constellation of Perseus. It has the Bayer designation d Persei, while 53 Persei is the Flamsteed designation. The star is visible to the naked eye as a faint, blue-white hued point of light with an apparent visual magnitude of 4.80. It is located approximately 480 light years away from the Sun, as determined from parallax, and is drifting further away with a radial velocity of +7.3 km/s.

This star has a stellar classification of B4IV, and was the prototype of a class of variable stars known as slowly pulsating B stars. It was one of the first mid-B type variable stars in the northern hemisphere to be studied. The star undergoes non-radial pulsations with a primary period of 2.36 days. Observation of the star with the BRITE satellite revealed eight separate frequencies in the star's light curve.

53 Persei is around 50 million years old with a projected rotational velocity of 15 km/s. It has six times the mass of the Sun and four times the Sun's radius. The star is radiating 780 times the luminosity of the Sun from its photosphere at an effective temperature of 16,720 K.

References

B-type subgiants
Slowly pulsating B stars

Perseus (constellation)
Persei, d
Persei, 53
BD+46 872
027396
020354
1350
Persei, V469